Cosâmbești is a commune located in Ialomița County, Muntenia, Romania. It is composed of two villages, Cosâmbești and Gimbășani. It also included Mărculești village until 2005, when this was split off to form Mărculești Commune.

References

Communes in Ialomița County
Localities in Muntenia